Patrice Derigobert Ollo N'Doumba (born January 10, 1986) is a Cameroonian football player, who has last playing for KuPS.

References

1986 births
Living people
Rovaniemen Palloseura players
Kuopion Palloseura players
AC Oulu players
Vaasan Palloseura players
Pallo-Kerho 37 players
Veikkausliiga players
Cameroonian footballers
Cameroonian expatriate footballers
Expatriate footballers in Finland
Cameroonian expatriate sportspeople in Finland
Association football midfielders